Wai Phyo Aung (born 15 May 1985) is a Burmese politician and medical doctor served as a member of parliament in the House of Representatives for Thaketa Township constituency from 2016 until his removal from office in the 2021 Myanmar coup d'état. He is a member of the National League for Democracy.

Early life and education 
Wai Phyo Aung was born on 15 May 1985 in Thaketa Township, Yangon Region. He graduated with M.B.B.S. from University of Medicine 2, Yangon in 2007. He is also a doctor and opened clinic in Yangon.

Political career
He is a member of the National League for Democracy Party. In 2015 election, he was elected as a Pyithu Hluttaw MP for Thaketa Township parliamentary constituency.

References

National League for Democracy politicians
1985 births
Living people
People from Yangon
Members of Pyithu Hluttaw
University of Medicine 2, Yangon alumni